The Partenavia P.48 Astore was a 1950s Italian light aircraft built by Luigi Pascale and his brother in Naples before establishing Partenavia.

Development
The Astore was a strut-braced high-wing cabin monoplane with a fixed tailwheel landing gear. It had two seats in tandem and was powered by a 65 hp (48 kW) Continental A65 engine. The prototype and only Astore, registered I-NAPA, was built in a garage in Naples and first flew in 1952, piloted by Mario de Bernardi.

Specifications

See also

References

Bibliography

 

Astore
1950s Italian civil utility aircraft
High-wing aircraft
Aircraft first flown in 1952